John Edward Abraham Mocatta (born 6 May 1936) is an English former first-class cricketer.

Mocatta was born at St John's Wood in May 1936. He was educated at Clifton College, before going up to New College, Oxford. While studying at Oxford, he made four appearances in first-class cricket for Oxford University against Gloucestershire, Yorkshire, Derbyshire, and the Free Foresters. He scored 106 runs in his four matches, at an average of 13.25 and a high score of 37. 

He later co-founded the Polack's House Educational Trust at Clifton College.

References

External links

1936 births
Living people
People from St John's Wood
People educated at Clifton College
Alumni of New College, Oxford
English cricketers
Oxford University cricketers